The Irish Sea is an extensive body of water that separates the islands of Ireland and Great Britain. It is linked to the Celtic Sea in the south by St George's Channel and to the Inner Seas off the West Coast of Scotland  in the north by the North Channel.
Anglesey, North Wales, is the largest island in the Irish Sea, followed by the Isle of Man. The term Manx Sea may occasionally be encountered.

On its shoreline are Scotland to the north, England to the east, Wales to the southeast, Northern Ireland and the Republic of Ireland to the west. The Irish Sea is of significant economic importance to regional trade, shipping and transport, as well as fishing and power generation in the form of wind power and nuclear power plants.

Topography

The Irish Sea joins the North Atlantic at both its northern and southern ends. To the north, the connection is through the North Channel between Scotland and Northern Ireland and the Malin Sea. The southern end is linked to the Atlantic through the St George's Channel between Ireland and Pembrokeshire, and the Celtic Sea.

The largest sandbanks are the Bahama and King William Banks to the east and north of the Isle of Man and the Kish Bank, Codling Bank, Arklow Bank and Blackwater Bank near the coast of Ireland.

The International Hydrographic Organization defines the limits of the Irish Sea (with St George's Channel) as follows,
On the North. The Southern limit of the Inner Seas off the West Coast of Scotland, defined as a line joining the South extreme of the Mull of Galloway (54°38'N) in Scotland and Ballyquintin Point (54°20'N) in Northern Ireland.
On the South. A line joining St. David's Head in Wales to Carnsore Point in Ireland .

The Irish Sea has undergone a series of dramatic changes over the last 20,000 years as the last glacial period ended and was replaced by warmer conditions. At the height of the glaciation, the central part of the modern sea was probably a long freshwater lake. As the ice retreated 10,000 years ago, the lake reconnected to the sea.

History

The Irish Sea was formed in the Neogene era. Notable crossings include several invasions from Britain. The Norman invasion of Ireland took place in stages during the late 12th century from Porthclais near St. Davids, Wales, in Hulks, Snekkars, Keels and Cogs to Wexford Harbour, Leinster. The Tudors crossed the Irish Sea to invade in 1529 in caravels and carracks. In 1690 the English fleet set sail for the Williamite War in Ireland from Hoylake, Wirral, the departure becoming permanently known as King's Gap as a result.

Shipping
Because Ireland has neither tunnel nor bridge to connect it with Great Britain, the vast majority of heavy goods trade is done by sea. Northern Ireland ports handle  of goods trade with the rest of the United Kingdom annually; the ports in the Republic of Ireland handle , representing 50% and 40% respectively of total trade by weight.

The Port of Liverpool handles  of cargo and 734,000 passengers a year.

Ports in the Republic handle 3,600,000 travellers crossing the sea each year, amounting to 92% of all Irish Sea travel.

Ferry connections from Wales to Ireland across the Irish Sea include Fishguard Harbour and Pembroke to Rosslare, Holyhead to Dún Laoghaire and Holyhead to Dublin. From Scotland, Cairnryan connects with both Belfast and Larne. There is also a connection between Liverpool and Belfast via the Isle of Man or direct from Birkenhead. The world's largest car ferry, Ulysses, is operated by Irish Ferries on the Dublin Port–Holyhead route; Stena Line also operates between Britain and Ireland.

"Irish Sea" is also the name of one of the BBC's Shipping Forecast areas defined by the coordinates:

Transport for Wales Rail, Iarnród Éireann, Irish Ferries, Stena Line, Northern Ireland Railways, Stena Line and ScotRail promote SailRail with through rail tickets for the train and the ferry.

The British ship LCT 326 sank in the Irish sea and was discovered in March 2020. In September 2021, the British Navy ship HMS Mercury was discovered; it sank in 1940. The British ship SS Mesaba was sunk by the Nasiz in 1918 and discovered more than a hundred years later, in 2022.  This ship is well known for sailing near the Titanic and for attempting to warn the Titanic about dangerous icebergs.

Oil and gas exploration

Caernarfon Bay Basin 

Only two exploration wells have been drilled so far, and there remain numerous undrilled targets in tilted fault block plays. As in the East Irish Sea Basin, the principal target reservoir is the Lower Triassic, Sherwood Sandstone, top-sealed by younger Triassic mudstones and evaporites. Wells in the Irish Sector to the west have demonstrated that pre-rift, Westphalian coal measures are excellent hydrocarbon source rocks, and are at peak maturity for gas generation (Maddox et al., 1995). Seismic profiles clearly image these strata continuing beneath a basal Permian unconformity into at least the western part of the Caernarfon Bay Basin.

The timing of gas generation presents the greatest exploration risk. Maximum burial of, and primary gas migration from, the source rocks could have terminated as early as the Jurassic, whereas many of the tilted fault blocks were reactivated or created during Paleogene inversion of the basin. However, it is also possible that a secondary gas charge occurred during regional heating associated with intrusion of Paleogene dykes, such as those that crop out nearby on the coastline of north Wales. (Floodpage et al., 1999) have invoked this second phase of Paleogene hydrocarbon generation as an important factor in the charging of the East Irish Sea Basin's oil and gas fields. It is not clear as yet whether aeromagnetic anomalies in the southeast of Caernarfon Bay are imaging a continuation of the dyke swarm into this area too, or whether they are instead associated with deeply buried Permian syn-rift volcanics. Alternatively, the fault block traps could have been recharged by exsolution of methane from formation brines as a direct result of the Tertiary uplift (cf. Doré and Jensen, 1996).

Cardigan Bay Basin 

The Cardigan Bay Basin forms a continuation into British waters of Ireland's North Celtic Sea Basin, which has two producing gas fields. The basin comprises a south-easterly deepening half-graben near the Welsh coastline, although its internal structure becomes increasingly complex towards the southwest. The basin has a proven petroleum system, with potentially producible gas reserves at the Dragon discovery near the UK/ROI median line, and oil shows in a further three wells. The Cardigan Bay Basin contains multiple reservoir targets, which include the Lower Triassic (Sherwood Sandstone), Middle Jurassic shallow marine sandstones and limestone (Great Oolite), and Upper Jurassic fluvial sandstone, the reservoir for the Dragon discovery.

The most likely hydrocarbon source rocks are Early Jurassic marine mudstones. These are fully mature for oil generation in the west of the British sector and are mature for gas generation nearby in the Irish sector. Gas-prone, Westphalian pre-rift coal measures may also be present at depth locally. The Cardigan Bay Basin was subjected to two Tertiary phases of compressive uplift, whereas maximum burial that terminated primary hydrocarbon generation was probably around the end of the Cretaceous, or earlier if Cretaceous strata, now missing, were never deposited in the basin. Despite the Tertiary structuration, the Dragon discovery has proved that potentially commercial volumes of hydrocarbons were retained at least locally in Cardigan Bay. In addition to undrilled structural traps, the basin contains the untested potential for stratigraphic entrapment of hydrocarbons near synsedimentary faults, especially in the Middle Jurassic section.

Liverpool Bay
The Liverpool Bay Development is BHP Billiton Petroleum's largest operated asset. It comprises the integrated development of  five offshore oil and gas fields in the Irish Sea:

 Douglas oil field
 Hamilton gas field
 Hamilton North gas field
 Hamilton East gas field
 Lennox oil and gas field

Oil is produced from the Lennox and Douglas fields. It is then treated at the Douglas Complex and piped  to an oil storage barge ready for export by tankers. Gas is produced from the Hamilton, Hamilton North and Hamilton East reservoirs. After initial processing at the Douglas Complex the gas is piped by subsea pipeline to the Point of Ayr gas terminal for further processing. The gas is then sent by onshore pipeline to PowerGen's combined cycle gas turbine power station at Connah's Quay. PowerGen is the sole purchaser of gas from the Liverpool Bay development.

The Liverpool Bay development comprises four offshore platforms. Offshore storage and loading facilities. The onshore gas processing terminal at Point of Ayr.
Production first started at each field as follows: Hamilton North in 1995, Hamilton in 1996, Douglas in 1996, Lennox (oil only) in 1996 and Hamilton East 2001. The first contract gas sales were in 1996.

The quality of the water in Liverpool Bay was historically contaminated by dumping of sewage sludge at sea but this practice became illegal in December 1988 and no further sludge was deposited after that date.

East Irish Sea Basin 

Early Namurian basinal mudstones are the source rocks for these hydrocarbons. Production from all fields is from fault-bounded traps of the Lower Triassic formation, principally the aeolian Sherwood Sandstone reservoir, top-sealed by younger Triassic continental mudstones and evaporites. Future mineral exploration will initially concentrate on extending this play, but there remains largely untested potential also for gas and oil within widespread Carboniferous fluvial sandstone reservoirs. This play requires intraformational mudstone seal units to be present, as there is no top-seal for reservoirs sub cropping the regional base Permian unconformity in the east of the basin, and Carboniferous strata crop out at the sea bed in the west.

Dalkey Island exploration prospect
Previous exploration drilling in the Kish Bank Basin has confirmed the potential for petroleum generation with oil shows seen in a number of wells together with natural hydrocarbon seeps recorded from airborne surveys. This feature, known as the Dalkey Island exploration prospect, may be prospective for oil, as there are prolific oil productive Lower Triassic reservoirs nearby in the eastern Irish Sea offshore Liverpool. However, given its location in shallow water and close proximity to shore, the prospect is of great interest as exploration drilling, together with any future development costs, are likely to be low.

Cities and towns
Below is a list of cities and towns around the Irish Sea coasts in order of size:

Counties bordering the Irish Sea

Islands
 Listed are the islands in the Irish Sea which are either at least one square kilometre in area, or which have a permanent population.
 Anglesey and Holy Island are included separately.

Environment 
The most accessible and possibly the greatest wildlife resource of the Irish Sea lies in its estuaries: particularly the Dee Estuary, the Mersey Estuary, the Ribble Estuary, Morecambe Bay, the Solway Firth, the Firth of Clyde, Belfast Lough, Strangford Lough, Carlingford Lough, Dundalk Bay, Dublin Bay and Wexford Harbour. However, a lot of wildlife also depends on the cliffs, salt marshes and sand dunes of the adjoining shores, the seabed and the open sea itself.

The information on the invertebrates of the seabed of the Irish Sea is rather patchy because it is difficult to survey such a large area, where underwater visibility is often poor and information often depends upon looking at material brought up from the seabed in mechanical grabs. However, the groupings of animals present depend to a large extent on whether the seabed is composed of rock, boulders, gravel, sand, mud or even peat. In the soft sediments seven types of community have been provisionally identified, variously dominated by brittle-stars, sea urchins, worms, mussels, tellins, furrow-shells, and tower-shells.

Parts of the bed of the Irish Sea are very rich in wildlife. The seabed southwest of the Isle of Man is particularly noted for its rarities and diversity, as are the horse mussel beds of Strangford Lough. Scallops and queen scallops are found in more gravelly areas. In the estuaries, where the bed is more sandy or muddy, the number of species is smaller but the size of their populations is larger. Brown shrimp, cockles and edible mussels support local fisheries in Morecambe Bay and the Dee Estuary and the estuaries are also important as nurseries for flatfish, herring and sea bass. Muddy seabeds in deeper waters are home to populations of the Dublin Bay prawn, also known as "scampi".

The open sea is a complex habitat in its own right. It exists in three spatial dimensions and also varies over time and tide. For example, where freshwater flows into the Irish Sea in river estuaries its influence can extend far offshore as the freshwater is lighter and "floats" on top of the much larger body of salt water until wind and temperature changes mix it in. Similarly, warmer water is less dense and seawater warmed in the inter-tidal zone may "float" on the colder offshore water. The amount of light penetrating the seawater also varies with depth and turbidity. This leads to differing populations of plankton in different parts of the sea and varying communities of animals that feed on these populations. However, increasing seasonal storminess leads to greater mixing of water and tends to break down these divisions, which are more apparent when the weather is calm for long periods.

Plankton includes bacteria, plants (phytoplankton) and animals (zooplankton) that drift in the sea. Most are microscopic, but some, such as the various species of jellyfish and sea gooseberry, can be much bigger.

Diatoms and dinoflagellates dominate the phytoplankton. Although they are microscopic plants, diatoms have hard shells and dinoflagellates have little tails that propel them through the water. Phytoplankton populations in the Irish Sea have a spring "bloom" every April and May, when the seawater is generally at its greenest.

Crustaceans, especially copepods, dominate the zooplankton. However, many animals of the seabed, the open sea and the seashore spend their juvenile stages as part of the zooplankton. The whole plankton "soup" is vitally important, directly or indirectly, as a food source for most species in the Irish Sea, even the largest. The enormous basking shark, for example, lives entirely on plankton and the leatherback turtle's main food is jellyfish.

A colossal diversity of invertebrate species live in the Irish Sea and its surrounding coastline, ranging from flower-like fan-worms to predatory swimming crabs to large chameleon-like cuttlefish.
Some of the most significant for other wildlife are the reef-building species like the inshore horse mussel of Strangford Lough, the inter-tidal honeycomb worm of Morecambe Bay, Cumbria and Lancashire, and the sub-tidal honeycomb worm of the Wicklow Reef. These build up large structures over many years and, in turn, provide surfaces, nooks and crannies where other marine animals and plants may become established and live out some or all of their lives.

There are quite regular records of live and stranded leatherback turtles in and around the Irish Sea. This species travels north to the waters off the British Isles every year following the swarms of jellyfish that form its prey. Loggerhead turtle, ridley sea turtle and green turtle are found very occasionally in the Irish Sea but are generally unwell or dead when discovered. They have strayed or been swept out of their natural range further south into colder waters.

The estuaries of the Irish Sea are of international importance for birds. They are vital feeding grounds on migration flyways for shorebirds travelling between the Arctic and Africa. Others depend on the milder climate as a refuge when continental Europe is in the grip of winter.

Twenty-one species of seabird are reported as regularly nesting on beaches or cliffs around the Irish Sea. Huge populations of the sea duck, common scoter, spend winters feeding in shallow waters off eastern Ireland, Lancashire and North Wales.

Whales, dolphins and porpoises all frequent the Irish Sea, but knowledge of how many there may be and where they go is somewhat sketchy. About a dozen species have been recorded since 1980, but only three are seen fairly often. These are the harbour porpoise, bottlenose dolphin and common dolphin. The more rarely seen species are minke whale, fin whale, sei whale, humpback whale, North Atlantic right whales which are now considered to be almost extinct in eastern North Atlantic, sperm whale, northern bottlenose whale, long-finned pilot whale, orca, white-beaked dolphin, striped dolphin and Risso's dolphin.  In 2005, a plan to reintroduce grey whales by airlifting 50 of them from the Pacific Ocean to the Irish Sea was claimed to be logically and ethically feasible; it had not been implemented by 2013.

The common or harbour seal and the grey seal are both resident in the Irish Sea. Common seals breed in Strangford Lough, grey seals in southwest Wales and, in small numbers, on the Isle of Man. Grey seals haul out, but do not breed, off Hilbre and Walney islands, Merseyside, the Wirral, St Annes, Barrow-in-Furness Borough, and Cumbria.

Radioactivity 
The Irish Sea has been described by Greenpeace as the most radioactively contaminated sea in the world with some "eight million litres of nuclear waste" discharged into it each day from Sellafield reprocessing plants, contaminating seawater, sediments and marine life.

Low-level radioactive waste has been discharged into the Irish Sea as part of operations at Sellafield since 1952. The rate of discharge began to accelerate in the mid- to late 1960s, reaching a peak in the 1970s and generally declining significantly since then. Improvements in the treatment of waste in 1985 and 1994 resulted in further reductions in radioactive waste discharge although the subsequent processing of a backlog resulted in increased discharges of certain types of radioactive waste. In total  of 241Pu was discharged over the period 1952 to 1998. Current rates of discharge for many radionuclides are at least 100 times lower than they were in the 1970s.

Analysis of the distribution of radioactive contamination after discharge reveals that mean sea currents result in much of the more soluble elements such as caesium being flushed out of the Irish Sea through the North Channel about a year after discharge. Measurements of technetium concentrations post-1994 has produced estimated transit times to the North Channel of around six months with peak concentrations off the northeast Irish coast occurring 18–24 months after peak discharge. Less soluble elements such as plutonium are subject to much slower redistribution. Whilst concentrations have declined in line with the reduction in discharges they are markedly higher in the eastern Irish Sea compared to the western areas. The dispersal of these elements is closely associated with sediment activity, with muddy deposits on the seabed acting as sinks, soaking up an estimated  of plutonium. The highest concentration is found in the eastern Irish Sea in sediment banks lying parallel to the Cumbrian coast. This area acts as a significant source of wider contamination as radionuclides are dissolved once again. Studies have revealed that 80% of current seawater contamination by caesium is sourced from sediment banks, whilst plutonium levels in the western sediment banks between the Isle of Man and the Irish coast are being maintained by contamination redistributed from the eastern sediment banks.

The consumption of seafood harvested from the Irish Sea is the main pathway for exposure of humans to radioactivity. In terms of risk to this group, heavy consumption of seafood generates a 1 in 18 million chance of causing cancer. The general risk of contracting cancer in Ireland is 1 in 522.

Proposed fixed sea link connections 

Discussions of linking Britain to Ireland began in 1895, with an application for £15,000 towards the cost of carrying out borings and soundings in the North Channel to see if a tunnel between Ireland and Scotland was viable. Sixty years later, Harford Montgomery Hyde, Unionist MP for North Belfast, called for the building of such a tunnel. A tunnel project has been discussed several times in the Irish parliament. Several potential projects have been proposed, including one between Dublin and Holyhead put forward in 1997 by the British engineering firm Symonds. At , it would have been by far the longest rail tunnel on earth with an estimated cost approaching £20 billion.

Wind power 

The site currently has seven GE 3.6 MW turbines, each with  diameter rotors, the world's first commercial application of offshore wind turbines over three megawatts in size. The operating company, Airtricity, has indefinite plans for nearly 100 further turbines on the site.

Further wind turbine sites include:
 Robin Rigg Wind Farm in the Solway Firth
 Thirty  3 MW turbines are operating in a wind farm  the coast of Walney Island.
 Turbines are being erected off the coast of Clogherhead (to be called the Oriel Wind Farm)
As of 2018, it is the largest on Earth.

In popular culture 
 During World War I the Irish Sea became known as "U-boat Alley", because the U-boats moved their emphasis from the Atlantic to the Irish Sea after the United States entered the war in 1917.
 The Port of Barrow-in-Furness, one of Britain's largest shipbuilding centres and home to the United Kingdom's only submarine-building complex, is only a minor port.
 The Irish Sea figures prominently in the Mabinogion. In the second branch of the Mabinogion the Irish Sea is crossed from the south to Harlech by Matholwch, the Irish King, who has come to seek the hand of Branwen ferch Llŷr, sister of Bendigeidfran, King of the Island of the Mighty. Branwen and Matholwch marry, but when she becomes abused by Matholwch, her brother crosses the sea from Wales to Ireland to rescue her. Within the story the Irish Sea is said to be shallow; in addition, it contains two rivers, the Lli and the Archan.
 The fictional Sodor, an island in both Wilbert Awdry's The Railway Series and the  children's TV show, Thomas and Friends based on Awdry's books, is located in the Irish Sea.

See also 
 List of crossings of the Irish Sea
 North Channel bridge proposal
 Transport in Ireland
 Transport in the United Kingdom
 Transport on the Isle of Man

Explanatory notes

References

Citations

General sources

Further reading

External links

 Fylde Coast Marine Life Project
 Irish Sea Conservation Zones
 The Wildlife Trusts Living Seas – Irish Sea

 
Bodies of water of Ireland
Bodies of water of Northern Ireland
Bodies of water of Wales
Borders of Wales
European seas
Geography of Northwestern Europe
Maritime boundaries
Republic of Ireland–United Kingdom border
Seas of the Republic of Ireland
Seas of the United Kingdom
Shipping Forecast areas